Back Again in the DHSS is the second album by UK rock band Half Man Half Biscuit, released in 1987.

The album was released after the band had split up, and comprised Peel Sessions along with some new songs.

"Dickie Davies Eyes" b/w "I Left My Heart In Papworth General" and "The Bastard Son of Dean Friedman" (12" only) had been released as a single in September 1986 and reached no.86 in the UK singles charts.

Some of the tracks were subsequently re-released on the compact disc ACD in 1989.

Track listing 
Back Again in the DHSS

 "The Best Things in Life"
 "D'Ye Ken Ted Moult?"
 "Reasons to Be Miserable (Part 10)"
 "Rod Hull Is Alive - Why?"
 "Dickie Davies Eyes"
 "The Bastard Son of Dean Friedman"
 "I Was a Teenage Armchair Honved Fan"
 "Arthur's Farm"
 "All I Want for Christmas Is a Dukla Prague Away Kit"
 "The Trumpton Riots" (7" remix)
 "I Hate Nerys Hughes (from the Heart)" (live) (cassette only)

Cultural references 
 The Best Things in Life - Dali, Gagarin, slippers and biros, the joys of staying in over going out
 D'Ye Ken Ted Moult? - Title refers to folk song "D'Ye Ken John Peel". Ted Moult and his Everest double glazing adverts demonstrating its indestructibility in all circumstances.
 Reasons to Be Miserable (Part 10) - Title refers to Ian Dury and the Blockheads song "Reasons to be Cheerful (Part 3). Sexist builders, Pierrot clowns, Siamese cats, Fry's Chocolate Cream and Turkish Delight adverts (full of Eastern monosodium glutamate), vampires, peaches on cornflakes, the annoyance generated by pretentious people
 Rod Hull Is Alive - Why? - topiary, Sarah Ferguson now ex-wife of The Duke of York, Rod Hull (who died in 1999), French racing driver Jacques Lafitte, the Wrekin (a hill in Shropshire), Helen Keller, National Service and the long defunct Watney Cup, why do good people die when less deserving don't?
 Dickie Davies Eyes - Title refers to Kim Carnes song "Bette Davis Eyes". The Lord of the Rings, Michael Moorcock, Brian Moore (football commentator), London Planetarium, Roger Dean posters. Cadbury's Flake suggestive advertising campaigns, Dickie Davies (sports commentator).
 The Bastard Son of Dean Friedman - As in "You can thank your lucky stars" you're not..., Bette Midler, Magritte,  Mary Poppins song "Supercalifragilisticexpialidocious", Borussia Mönchengladbach (German football team).
 I Was a Teenage Armchair Honved Fan - Budapest, Budapest Honved FC, Morphy Richards (kitchen appliance manufacturer), the blues (woke up this morning...)
 Arthur's Farm - Title refers to George Orwell novel "Animal Farm". Arthur Askey, Douglas Bader, the Luftwaffe, amputation of limbs
 All I Want for Christmas Is a Dukla Prague Away Kit - Childhood memories of Scalextric and its propensity to break down, Subbuteo table football, Dukla Prague (Czech football team, now FK Dukla Prague), Giro benefit cheques.
 The Trumpton Riots - Trumpton, 1960's children's television animated series and various characters within it. CS Gas, Brian Cant (narrator of Trumpton), Basque separatists, Socialism, nail bombs.
 I Hate Nerys Hughes (From the Heart) - Saint Vitus dance, Social Security (the "social", as well as "Supplementary"), the walking dead, supermarkets, Bath, and of course, Nerys Hughes, a Welsh actress best known for playing a scouser in the sitcom, the Liver Birds

References

1987 albums
Half Man Half Biscuit albums